Zone of Blue is the eighth studio album by Dogbowl, independently released on May 15, 2015 by 62TV Records.

Track listing

Personnel 
Adapted from Zone of Blue liner notes.

 Dogbowl – vocals, guitar, cover art
Musicians
 Marleen Cappelemans – saxophone
 Philippe Decoster – bass guitar, production
 François Maquet – guitar
 Christophe Raes – drums

Additional musicians
 Rodolphe Coster – guitar (11)
Production and additional personnel
 Stéphane Schrevens – recording, mixing
 Uwe Teichert – mastering

Release history

References

External links 
 Zone of Blue at Discogs (list of releases)

2015 albums
Dogbowl albums